Freaky is the second studio album by English R&B group, MN8. It was released in 1996 by Columbia Records. The album includes the singles, "Tuff Act to Follow" and "Dreaming".

Track listing
"Tuff Act to Follow" (3:43)
"Dreaming" (5:07)
"Freaky" (3:59)
"I'll Give You My Everything" (4:04)
"Baby, I Surrender" (5:05)
"Beautiful Body" (4:41)
"It's All On You" (5:19)
"Shake It" (4:57)
"This Heart" (3:59)
"I Promise" (3:56)
"Keep It in the Family" (4:20)
"Talk to You" (4:38)

References 

1996 albums
MN8 albums